Christopher de Bellaigue (born 1971 in London) is a journalist who has worked on the Middle East and South Asia since 1994. His work mostly chronicles developments in Iran and Turkey.

Biography
De Bellaigue, who attended Eton College, is from an Anglo-French background. He obtained a BA and MA in Oriental Studies from the University of Cambridge, where he was a student at Fitzwilliam College. His first book, In the Rose Garden of the Martyrs: A Memoir of Iran, was shortlisted for the Royal Society of Literature's Ondaatje Prize.  In 2007–2008, he was a visiting fellow at St Antony's College, Oxford, where he began work on his biography of the Iranian prime minister, Mohammad Mossadegh.

De Bellaigue is a frequent contributor to The Guardian, New York Review of Books, Granta, and The New Yorker, among other publications. He was formerly the Tehran correspondent for The Economist. He lives in London with his wife Bita Ghezelayagh, who is an Iranian architect, and two children.

In 2012, de Bellaigue's book about Prime Minister of Iran Mohammad Mossadegh, Patriot of Persia: Muhammad Mossadegh and a Tragic Anglo-American Coup, was published. It won the Bronze Washington Institute Book Prize.

Rebel Land

De Bellaigue's 2009 book Rebel Land: Unraveling the Riddle of History in a Turkish Town is based largely on research he conducted in Varto, a small town in southeastern Turkey. The book begins with a story of de Bellaigue's essay published in the New York Review of Books, whose allusion to the Armenian genocide prompted a letter from the Harvard Professor James R. Russell accusing de Bellaigue of promoting denialist views, as well as criticism from the magazine's editor Robert Silvers. Dismayed to realize that he had gotten his information on these events only from Turkish and pro-Turkish writers, de Bellaigue set out to find out the truth through his own research. In his book de Bellaigue criticizes the Turkish historians who, he argues, have whitewashed the history surrounding the Armenian Genocide, and also "worries that 'a genocide fixation' has blinded both sides to all shades of gray".

In a New York Times review, Dwight Garner calls the book "murky and uneven" and "as much memoir as proper history". In another New York Times review, Joseph O'Neill writes that de Bellaigue investigates the situation on the ground "brilliantly and evenhandedly (if occasionally emotively). Analytically, however, he can be abrupt." Reviewing Rebel Land in The Telegraph, Sameer Rahim called it "a fascinating book".

Bibliography

 ISBN 978-0066209807
The Struggle for Iran (2007). New York: New York Review of Books. ISBN 9781590172384
Rebel Land: Among Turkey's Forgotten People (2009). New York: The Penguin Press. ISBN 978-1594202520 
Patriot of Persia: Muhammad Mossadegh and a Tragic Anglo-American Coup (2012). New York: Harper. ISBN 978-0061844706
The Islamic Enlightenment: The Modern Struggle Between Faith and Reason, 1798 to Modern Times (2017). New York: Liveright Publishing. ISBN 9780871403735
ReTargeting Iran (City Lights Publishers, 2020) (Written by David Barsamian, includes an interview with Christopher de Bellaigue). San Francisco: City Lights Books. ISBN 9780872868045
 The Lion House: The Coming of a King (2022). New York: Farrar, Straus and Giroux. ISBN 9780374279189

Documentaries
Iran and Britain (BBC Four, February 2009 )

External links
Profile at the New York Review of Books
Interview at AsiaSource
Articles in Granta
Articles in Harper's
Articles in the London Review of Books

References

1971 births
Living people
Alumni of Fitzwilliam College, Cambridge
British expatriates in Iran
British male journalists
British writers
Fellows of St Antony's College, Oxford
People educated at Eton College
The New York Review of Books people
Writers from London